La Vendéenne is a Roller Hockey team from La Roche-sur-Yon, France, founded in 1956.

Trophies
 French Championship: (13)
 1975–76, 1977–78, 1978–79, 1981–82, 1986–87, 1988–89, 1995–96, 2002–03, 2003–04, 2004–05, 2006–07, 2015–16, 2016–17
 French Cup: 6
 2002, 2006, 2007, 2011, 2014, 2016

External links
Official Website

Roller hockey clubs in France
Sports clubs established in 1956
1956 establishments in France